Norman Long may refer to:
 Norman Long (anthropologist)
 Norman Long (entertainer)